Gerlin Naisson (born 17 October 1978) is an Estonian former footballer who played as a defender and midfielder for the Estonia women's national team.

Career
Naisson played in the first ever official match for Estonia, against Lithuania. Following her retirement from playing, she worked as a sales representative for Adidas.

References

1978 births
Living people
Women's association football defenders
Estonian women's footballers
Estonia women's international footballers
Women's association football midfielders
Sportspeople from Pärnu